TxT is a 2006 Filipino supernatural horror film directed by Michael Tuviera and starring Angel Locsin, Dennis Trillo, Oyo Sotto, Julia Clarete, Dante Rivero and Eugene Domingo. It was Tuviera's debut film as a director.

Plot
Joyce (Angel Locsin), who is a caregiver in a local elderly home, broke up with her obsessive boyfriend, Roman (Oyo Boy Sotto). As a final request, Roman asked Joyce to drive him home with his car. The two had a tragic accident killing Roman and leaving Joyce wounded.

Alex (Dennis Trillo), a call center agent and has feelings for Joyce, comforts Joyce due to Roman's death. Days have passed and Joyce is receiving messages in her cellphone from Roman's number but dismisses it as a cruel prank. Roman's haunting continues by sending Joyce images of her current activities. Roman's haunting becomes more disturbing when Joyce starts receiving messages containing images of her acquaintances dead at exactly 3:29 am.

Aling Kuring (Eugene Domingo), a local eatery owner and one of the people in the sent images, receives a call from Roman. Thinking it as a prank, Kuring answered the phone causing her head to shake violently to death. Lola Lilia (Perla Bautista), Joyce's patient, is under the latter's constant watch after Joyce receives a text from Roman showing Lilia's death. Before 3:29 am, Joyce fell asleep and her phone began to ring, waking up Lilia. Unable to wake Joyce, Lilia answered the call killing her the same way Kuring died.

Joyce noticed that Roman is killing the people who did not support their relationship. She sought the help of Dante (Dante Rivero), an anting-anting vendor and at the same time a witch doctor. Dante asked Joyce if Roman is doing any occult activities and asked for some of Roman's possessions. Joyce breaks into Roman's room but was caught by Edith (Bing Loyzaga), Roman's mother and also blamed Joyce for the death of her son. Joyce received another message from Roman showing an image of her best friend and next target, Ida (Julia Clarete). Joyce asked Ida to apologize to Roman for not supporting their relationship in an attempt to persuade Roman not to kill her instead, Ida berates Roman in his grave. Later, Joyce was arrested for trespassing and under Edith's request to detain her for the night. Joyce was able to bribe a policeman with a cellphone in order to escape and also asked help to protect Ida on her impending doom. Joyce was able to reach Ida in the latter's home and wait for the police to arrive. As the police is en route to Ida's house, their chief (most likely Roman's manipulation) ordered them to respond to a nearby accident. Joyce, in a panic as the police is diverting away, left Ida alone in her room and to be killed by Roman.

Joyce was able to obtain some of Roman's possessions, his bloodied phone and a piece of paper containing a picture of him with Joyce together surrounded by incantations and symbols, through his mother, Edith. Joyce gave these objects to Dante. It was revealed that before the car accident Roman forced Joyce to perform a blood pact, while driving, by spilling drops of their blood over Roman's phone. The ensuing struggle caused the accident. While Dante further analyzes the other object, Joyce received another message from Roman showing Joyce and Alex in a car accident causing Joyce to flee. Alex followed Joyce and the two had an argument. Joyce, wanting Alex not to be involved, tries to dissuade him but Alex insisted to be with her eventually confessing his feelings for her.

Dante realized that the incantation written on the paper means "shadow" and warns Joyce through a text that Roman's spirit follows her through her shadow. Roman took over Joyce's body and forced her to ride the car with Alex. Roman knocks both of them unconscious and took control of the car. Dante, driving a car, tries to warn Joyce through the phone causing him to collide with the car containing Joyce and Alex. Dante's car fell off the cliff and Joyce's car crashed in a nearby post. Joyce, who is conscious, tries to save Dante but it is too late. Dante however managed to write the warning by typing a text message warning Joyce that Roman will take over Alex's body. Alex emerged from the top of the cliff and as Joyce cries for mercy and the lightning strikes, he appeared closer to the screen revealing Roman successfully possessed him.

Cast
 Angel Locsin as Joyce
 Dennis Trillo as Alex
 Richard Gutierrez as Alex posses by Roman
 Oyo Sotto as Roman 
 Julia Clarete as Ida
 Dante Rivero as Dante
 Eugene Domingo as Aling Kuring
 Bing Loyzaga as Edith
 Lorenzo Mara as Allan
 Perla Bautista as Lola Lilia
 Allan K. as Quiapo Seller 1
 Roselle Gabriel as Quiapo Seller 2
 Bubbles Cristobal as Quiapo Buyer
 Mitoy Sta. Ana as SP01 Moya
 Malou Crisologo as Hospice Administrator
 Bong Dela Torre as Father Javier
 Karla Pambid as Ida's Mother
 Jim Pebangco as Ida's Father
 Luz Imperial as Beth
 Emelyn Santos as Maid 2
 Rene Mendoza as Mortician
 Eddie Boy Tuviera as Joey
 Paul Daza as Mourner 1
 Edgar Allan Guzman as Kanto Boy
 Ryan Julio as Kanto Boy
 Macky Aquino as Texting Carinderia Patron
 John Medina as Carinderia Patron 1
 Ryan Forbes as Carinderia Patron 2
 Jojo Oconer as Carinderia Patron 3
 Bo Vicencio as Carinderia Patron 4
 Cora Galdo as Jeep Passenger
 Mohammad Dana as Flirting Waiter
 Jeff Geraldine Vedeja as Coffee Shop Waitress
 Charles Edward Martinez as Call Center Employee

Reception
Txt was rated "A" by the Cinema Evaluation Board for its 'excellent' and 'brilliant' cinematography. However it bombed at the Philippine box office.

See also
 List of ghost films

References

External links
 Click The City review
 Regal DVD page
 

2006 horror films
2006 films
Philippine horror films
Philippine mystery films
2000s mystery films
Philippine ghost films
Regal Entertainment films
Films directed by Mike Tuviera